Frederick William Piesse (10 December 1848 – 6 March 1902) was a member of the first Australian federal parliament.

Born in Hobart, Tasmania, Piesse worked in law, conveyancing, shipping and horticulture before being elected to the Tasmanian House of Assembly as the Member for North Hobart in 1893. In April 1894, Piesse resigned from the House of Assembly as part of an arrangement to swap seats with Legislative Council member for Buckingham, Philip Fysh, to enable Fysh to take the role of Treasurer in Edward Braddon's ministry. Piesse served as an Honorary Minister from 1899 to 1901.

Piesse was elected as a Free Trader to the first federal Australian Parliament as one of the five members for Tasmania.  His tenure as a federal parliamentarian would be short lived, however, as he died less than a year after his election.  He was the first serving Tasmanian Member of the House of Representatives to die.

References

1848 births
1902 deaths
Free Trade Party members of the Parliament of Australia
Members of the Australian House of Representatives for Tasmania
Members of the Australian House of Representatives
Members of the Tasmanian House of Assembly
Members of the Tasmanian Legislative Council
19th-century Australian politicians
20th-century Australian politicians